The Sahara Seamounts are a group of seamounts which are located in the Atlantic Ocean between  southwest of the island of El Hierro, part of the Canary Islands. The presence of seismic lines around these seamounts show local unconformity or even sills which are quite high up among the sedimentary series and these features suggest that there was volcanic activity as late as at least the Cenozoic.

These seamounts are home to a variety of marine life including deep-sea sharks (such as the Bluntnose sixgill shark Hexanchus griseus, rays, wreckfish, conger eels, gadellas, escolars, roughies and other species of fish that occur in the extensive areas of sponges, gorgonians and corals. They contain the most southerly known beds of the glass sponges Asconema setubalense. Images taken from an ROV show that these seamounts have rocky and sandy sea beds which are volcanic in origin and that they contain numerous caves, overhangs and cracks which shelter a variety of animals.

These seamounts may be rich in certain minerals and the crust is rich in cobalt, as sampling at the Tropic Seamount, one of the Sahara Seamounts, showed.

References

Geology of the Atlantic Ocean
Seamounts of the Atlantic Ocean